Union Sportive Bénédictine is a football club from Saint-Benoît, Réunion Island. The club plays their home matches at Stade Jean Allane, which has a maximum capacity of 1,200 people.

Achievements
 Coupe de la Réunion: 2
1962, 1972

The club in the French football structure
 Coupe de France: 5 appearances
1965–66, 1966–67, 1969–70, 1972–73, 1981–82

References

Bénédictine
Association football clubs established in 1954
1954 establishments in Réunion